Hāji Firuz or Khwāje Piruz is a fictional character in Iranian folklore who appears in the streets by the beginning of Nowruz. His face is covered in soot, and he is clad in bright red clothes and a felt hat. He dances through the streets while singing and playing a tambourine.

Etymology
Haji, as written with the eighth letter of Perso-Arabic alphabet, has a meaning unrelated to that of the word Hajji; it is a form of address, much like using sir to address a person in English, without the person being a knight. Firuz is the Arabized version of the Persian word piruz, meaning 'victor'.

Khaje Piruz is the other version of the term, which consists of the word khaje, identified as an Iranian title meaning 'master', and the non-Arabized piruz.

History
In the traditional songs, he introduces himself as a serf trying to cheer people whom he refers to as his lords.

The exact history of Hajji Firuz is unknown. According to some sources, Hajji Firuz is based on a tradition called Mir Nowruzi. Mir Nowruz was a comical figure chosen to rule the municipality for "the last five days of the year" (Panje). The temporary "five-day king" (Šāh e Panj Ruze) would often parade the city with a group of singers and dancers for the Nowruz celebrations.

Mehrdad Bahar, a prominent Persian historian, opined in 1983 that the figure of Hajji Firuz may be derived from ceremonies and legends connected to the epic of Prince Siavash, which are in turn derived from those associated with the Mesopotamian deity of agriculture and flocks, Tammuz (Sumerian Dumuzi). Later, it was claimed that the blackened face of Hajji Firuz symbolizes his returning from the world of the dead, his red clothing is the sign of the blood of Siavash and the coming to life of the sacrificed deity, while his joviality is the jubilation of rebirth, typical of those who bring rejuvenation and blessing along with themselves. Bahar speculates that the name Siyāwaxš might mean 'black man' or 'dark-faced man' and suggests that the term black in the name may be a reference either to the blackening of the faces of the participants in the aforementioned Mesopotamian ceremonies, or to the black masks that they wore for the festivities.

Typical songs

Hājji Firouz E!

Hājji firuz e, sāl-i ye ruz e (It’s Hajji Firuz, it’s only one day a year)

Hame midunan, man am midunam (Everyone knows, I know as well)

Eyd e Nowruz e, sāl-i ye ruz e (It's Nowruz, it’s only one day a year)

Arbāb e Xod am

Arbāb e xod am, "sāmmule baleykom" (Greetings, my lord)

Arbāb e xod am, sar et-o bālā kon (Raise your head, my lord)

Arbāb e xod am, lotf-i be mā kon (Do me a favor, my lord)

Arbāb e xod am, be man nigā kon (Look at me, my lord)

Arbāb e xod am, boz-boz e qandi (My lord, the billy goat)

Arbāb e xod am, čerā nemi-xandi? (Why don’t you smile, my lord?)

Beškan Beškan

Beškan beškan e, beškan! (It's a snap-snap, snap!)

Man nemi-škanam, beškan! (I won't snap, snap!)

Injā beškanam, yār gele dāre (If I snap here, this one will complain)

Unjā beškanam, yār gele dāre (If I snap there, that one will complain)

In siāh e bičāre če qad howsele dāre! (How patient this poor black [man] is!)

See also

References

Bibliography
 Richardson, John. Wilkens, Charles, ed. (1810). A Vocabulary, Persian, Arabic, and English: Abridged.... London: F. & C. Rivingson. [OCLC: 5631372]

External links

Ḥāji Firuz article by Encyclopædia Iranica
The Persian Nowruz By Iraj Bashiri
Haji Firuz: The Traditional Herald of Norouz

Iranian folklore
Nowruz
Holiday characters